Ceyhun Atuf Kansu (1919-1978) was a Turkish pediatrician, author and poet.

Life
Ceyhun Atuf was born  to Nafi and Müfdalein Istanbul, Ottoman Empire on 7 December 1919. After the death of his mother his father moved to Ankara, the capital of the nationalists. He graduated from the Gazi High School in Ankara in 1938, and the School of Medicine of Istanbul University in 1944. He served in the Numune Hospital in Ankara. During this time, he opened a private clinic for the children in a poor neighborhood of Ankara. Then for eleven years, he served as a pediatrician in the  clinic of the Sugar Refinery of Turhal in Tokat Province. After 1959, he returned to Ankara to serve in the Clinics of the Sugar Refineries there. He died on 10 March 1978.

Literary career
Already during the early years of his career, he devoted himself to the children. Later, he also got interested in social issues and national independence. His books, some published after his death, are the following:
	
 1966: Atatürkçü Olmak ("Being Kemalist")
 1969: Atatürk ve Kurtuluş Savaşı ("Atatürk and the National War of Independence")
 1970: Buğday, Kadın, Gül ve Gökyüzü ("Woman, Rose and the Sky")
 1971: Balım Kız Dalım Oğul ("My Daughter the Honey, my Son the Branch")
 1972: Halk Önderi Atatürk ("Leader Atatürk")
 1972: Sevgi Elması ("The Apple of Love")
 1973: Cumhuriyet Ağacı ("The Tree of the Republic")
 1973: Cumhuriyet Bayrağı Altında ("Under the Flag of the Republic")
 1991: Bir Kasabadan Resimler ("Photographs from a Town")
 1991: Güneş Salkımı ("Bunch of Sun")
 1994: Halk Albümü ("People’s Album")
 1996: Söylevi Okurken ("While Reading the Speech")
 2004: Kardeş Sofrası ("Brother’s Table")

He also wrote professional books:
 1954: Turhal Dolaylarında Çocuk Bakımı("Childcare around Turhal") 
 1959: Anneler Soruyorlar ("Mothers ask") 
 1961: Kasabalar ve Köylerde Çocuk Bakımı ("Childcare in towns and villages")

Legacy
The "Ceyhun Atuf Kansu Poetry Award Contest" is an annual prize established by the municipality of Çankaya after his death. There are a street, a park and a play field all in Ankara named after him.

References

1919 births
Writers from Istanbul
Istanbul University Faculty of Medicine alumni
Turkish pediatricians
Turkish male writers
Turkish male poets
1978 deaths
Physicians from Istanbul